Alevia is one of eight parishes (administrative divisions) in Peñamellera Baja, a municipality within the province and autonomous community of Asturias, in northern Spain.

In 2011, the population of the parish is 60.

References

Parishes in Peñamellera Baja